Oleg Kubarev (born 8 February 1966) is a Belarusian football manager and former footballer (midfielder).

Career
From September 2013 to December 2014 he was head coach of Zimbru Chișinău in the Moldovan National Division.

Honours

As player
Metallurg Molodechno
Belarusian SSR League champion: 1991
Soviet Amateur Cup winner: 1991

As coach
Gomel
Belarusian Cup winner: 2010–11
Belarusian Super Cup winner: 2012

Zimbru Chișinău
Moldovan Cup winner: 2013–14
Moldovan Super Cup winner: 2014

Spartaks Jūrmala
Latvian Higher League champion: 2016

References

External links
 
 Profile  at zimbru.md
 Oleg Kubarev at Footballdatabase

1966 births
Living people
People from Zhodzina
Sportspeople from Minsk Region
Belarusian footballers
Association football midfielders
Belarusian expatriate footballers
Expatriate footballers in Russia
Expatriate footballers in Kazakhstan
Expatriate footballers in Latvia
FC Torpedo-BelAZ Zhodino players
FC Vitebsk players
FC Molodechno players
FC Yugra Nizhnevartovsk players
SK Blāzma players
FC Spartak Semey players
FC Torpedo Mogilev players
FC Lida players
Belarusian football managers
Belarusian expatriate football managers
Expatriate football managers in Moldova
Expatriate football managers in Latvia
Expatriate football managers in Tajikistan
FC Darida Minsk Raion managers
FC Torpedo Zhodino managers
FC Gomel managers
FC Zimbru Chișinău managers
FC Dacia Chișinău managers
FC Shakhtyor Soligorsk managers
Riga FC managers
FK Jelgava managers
Moldovan Super Liga managers
FC Krumkachy Minsk managers